Edoardo Ceria (born 26 May 1995) is an Italian footballer who plays as a forward for US Fiorenzuola.

Club career 
Ceria is a youth exponent from Juventus. In September 2013, Atalanta acquired half of the registration rights of Ceria (for €0.80 million) and Prince-Désir Gouano (€0.45 million), as part of deal for Luca Barlocco for €1.25 million. However, Ceria and Gouano remained in Juventus and Waalwijk respectively in a temporary deal. In June 2014, the co-ownership of Barlocco, Ceria, Emmanuello and Cais were renewed.

During the 2014–15 season, he played on loan with FC Den Bosch. He made his league debut at 10 August 2014 against Sparta Rotterdam. At 15 August 2014, he scored his first two goals for Den Bosch against VVV Venlo.

On 24 June 2015, Atalanta acquired Boakye for €1.6 million, Emmanuello for €0.8 million (swap with Cais also for  €0.8 million) and Ceria for  €0.5 million (part of Barlocco deal for  €0.95 million).

References

External links
 
 

Italian footballers
1995 births
Living people
Association football forwards
Italy youth international footballers
FC Spartak Trnava players
FC Den Bosch players
S.S. Arezzo players
Pol. Olympia Agnonese players
Serie B players
Eerste Divisie players
Serie D players
Slovak Super Liga players
Italian expatriate footballers
Expatriate footballers in Slovakia
Expatriate footballers in the Netherlands
Italian expatriate sportspeople in the Netherlands
Italian expatriate sportspeople in Slovakia